The Lanz Bulldog D 9506 is a tractor of the HR 8 series, produced by Heinrich Lanz AG in Mannheim from 1934 to 1955, with a production stop in 1945. In total, 3817 units were produced. The tractor was sold under the brand name Ackerluft (field-air). The Ursus C-45, produced in Poland from 1947 to 1959, was an illegal copy of the D 9506.

Description 

The D 9506 utilises a frameless block construction. It has a rear live axle and a dead front beam axle. The front axle was available with optional leaf springs. The tractor has air filled tyres. The D 9506 does not have a lockable differential. The gearbox is a manual 3-speed Lanz gearbox with a reverse gear, and an additional range, this makes 6 forward gears and 2 reverse gears. The minimum speed is 3,3 km/h in first gear, maximum speed is 16,7 km/h in sixth gear. The drum brakes at the rear wheels are foot-operated, the handbrake locks the gearbox.

The standard Lanz hot-bulb engine with a displacement of 10.3 L was used, it has a thermosiphon cooler. Compared to the predecessor series HR 6 and HR 7, the engine now has a better speed governor, the rated engine speed was increased from 540 min−1 to 630 min−1. Many sorts of diesel oil can be used as fuel. The D 9506 has an electrical system. If a starter motor is used, the lead-battery has a capacity of 94 Ah, without a starter motor the capacity is 75 Ah. The Lanz factory offered additional accessories, such as a cab or fenders.

Technical data

References 

Tractors